The 1980–81 Segunda División was the 32nd season of the Mexican Segunda División. The season started on 19 July 1980 and concluded on 26 July 1981. It was won by Atlético Morelia.

Changes 
 Atletas Campesinos was promoted to Primera División.
 Jalisco was relegated from Primera División.
 Oaxtepec was promoted from Tercera División.
 UV Coatzacoalcos was relegated from Segunda División.

Teams

Group stage

Group 1

Group 2

Group 3

Group 4

Results

Final stage

Group 1

Group 2

Final

References 

1980–81 in Mexican football
Segunda División de México seasons